Kusmark is a locality situated in Skellefteå Municipality, Västerbotten County, Sweden with 441 inhabitants in 2010.

Notable natives
Viktor Arvidsson, ice hockey player for the Nashville Predators
Pär Lindholm, ice hockey player for the Boston Bruins

References

External links

Populated places in Västerbotten County
Populated places in Skellefteå Municipality